Gachin (also Romanized as Gachīn) is a village in Soghan Rural District, Soghan District, Arzuiyeh County, Kerman Province, Iran. At the 2006 census, its population was 573, in 128 families.

References 

Populated places in Arzuiyeh County